Kaavi art (Devanagari:कावि कला) is a form of murals found in Konkan region especially in temples of Goa, parts of coastal Maharashtra and Karnataka. Kaavi murals can also be seen in old houses, small shrines.

Materials
The term Kaav (Devanagari:काव) in Konkani refers to Indian red pigment which is the only color used in this painting, is obtained from the laterite soil. 
Artistically drawn and well executed, reddish brown murals against white sandblasted backgrounds are the specialties of Kaavi art. Snow white lime, obtained by burning seashells, and washed sand from river beds were mixed with jaggery and allowed to ferment for two weeks. The mixture is then hand-pounded to obtain a homogeneous substance, which hardens when applied to the walls.

Technique
On the wet walls on which Kaavi pictures are to be etched, a buttery smooth mixture of lime and uramunji is smeared with a steel trowel. To cover larger areas, a wooden float is also employed. After an hour, engraving work commences. A well-trained Kaavi art mason can etch a small mural without any aids. For geometrical designs he employs rulers and compasses. Large and complicated motifs are first drawn on paper, perforated with pinholes and then traced on the wall by dusting the pinholes with dry lime.
Kanthas or the steel bodkins of different sizes and dimensions are used for etching. The ridges, platforms and niches are decorated with the rows of spirals, spades, semi-circles and curves. The V-shaped parallel bands are used for twin pseudo-pillars.

Decline
Kaavi art is almost an dying form of art and lacks revival attempts. Renovation and reconstruction of temples has been a major factor for decline of this art form.

Notes

Further reading
Kavikale by Dr. K.L.Kamat (in Kannada), Karnataka Arts Academy, 1993
Konkanyali kaavi kalain Konkani
Sivaramamurthi C., Indian Paintings, National Book Trust of India, 1970

 
Murals in India
Schools of Indian painting
Murals